Edwin Lara Barrios (born 8 September 1999) is a professional soccer player who currently plays as a defender for San Diego 1904 FC in the National Independent Soccer Association. Born in the United States, he represented the Mexico national under-17 team. He was included in The Guardians "Next Generation 2016".

International career
Lara was eligible to represent either the United States or Mexico, having been born in California to Mexican parents. Lara originally represented the United States U15s and United States U17s before joining the Mexico U17s. He represented Mexico at the 2015 FIFA U-17 World Cup. In 2019, Lara filed a one-time switch of association with FIFA to leave Mexico's program and join the United States U20s at their first camp of the year, thus confirming his international future with the US Men.

Career statistics

Club

Notes

Honours
Mexico U17
CONCACAF U-17 Championship: 2015

References

1999 births
Living people
American soccer players
Mexican footballers
Association football defenders
C.F. Pachuca players
Club León footballers
Soccer players from Berkeley, California
American sportspeople of Mexican descent
United States men's youth international soccer players
Mexico youth international footballers
Liga Premier de México players
USL Championship players
San Diego Loyal SC players
De Anza Force players